Ralph de Cromwell, 1st Baron Cromwell  2nd creation (died 27 August 1398), Tattershall in Lincolnshire, was an English peer. He was summoned to the House of Lords as Lord Cromwell in 1375.

Cromwell died in August 1398, and was succeeded in the barony by his son, Ralph.  His grandson, 3rd Baron Cromwell, served as Lord Privy Councillor, Treasurer of England and Chamberlain of the Household during the reign of Henry VI.  He and Thomas Cromwell share descent from Baron John de Cromwell the first Baron Cromwell.

Family
Ralph married Maud (b.1337), daughter of John Bernack and Joan (d.1361), daughter of John Marmion, 4th Baron Marmion of Winteringham and had the following issue:-

 Ralph Cromwell. Son and heir.
 Amice de Cromwell
 Maud de Cromwell
 Elizabeth de Cromwell

References

Bibliography
 
Kidd, Charles, Williamson, David (editors). Debrett's Peerage and Baronetage (1990 edition). New York: St Martin's Press, 1990.
 

1398 deaths
Year of birth unknown
Peers created by Edward III
Barons Cromwell